Carta a Eva is a two-part Spanish television miniseries directed by Agustí Villaronga, starring Julieta Cardinali, Ana Torrent and Nora Navas. It originally aired on La 1 in 2013.

Premise 
The fiction deals about how the lives of three different women—Eva Perón (first lady of Argentina), Carmen Polo (Francisco Franco's wife) and Juana Doña (a communist militant)—intertwine during the official visit paid by the first one to Spain in 1947, when the country was internationally isolated and the population starving.

Cast 
Main
 Julieta Cardinali as Eva Perón.
 Ana Torrent as Carmen Polo.
 Nora Navas as Juana Doña.
  as Franco.
 Carmen Maura as Paca, Juana Doña's mother.
Supporting

Production and release 
It was co-produced by TVE, TV3 and Copia Cero. Filming took place in Barcelona. Directed by Agustí Villaronga, the screenplay was authored by Villaronga together with Alfred Pérez and Roger Danès. The miniseries was pre-screened at the San Sebastián International Film Festival. The two parts were released by Televisión Española from 30 May to 6 June 2013, earning average viewership figures of 2,666,000 viewers and a 14% audience share.

Awards and nominations 

|-
| align = "center" rowspan = "4" | 2013 || rowspan = "2" | 26th Festival International de Programmes Audiovisuels || Best Screenplay || Agustí Villaronga, Alfred Pérez & Roger Danès ||  || rowspan = "2" | 
|-
| Best Actress || Julieta Cardinali || 
|-
| rowspan = "2" | 53rd Monte-Carlo Television Festival || colspan = "2" | Best Miniseries ||  || rowspan = "2" | 
|-
| Best Actress || Julieta Cardinali || 
|-
| align = "center" | 2014 || 6th Gaudí Awards || colspan = "2" | Best TV Movie ||  || 
|}

References 

Spanish television miniseries
Television series set in 1947
2013 Spanish television series debuts
2013 Spanish television series endings
2010s Spanish drama television series
Television shows set in Spain
Television shows filmed in Spain
Cultural depictions of Eva Perón
Cultural depictions of Francisco Franco
La 1 (Spanish TV channel) network series
Spanish-language television shows